Wanda Rijo Contreras (born November 26, 1979) is a female former weightlifter from the Dominican Republic. She twice competed at the Summer Olympics: 2000 and 2004. Rijo won the only gold medal for the Dominican Republic at the 1999 Pan American Games in Winnipeg, Manitoba, Canada. A year later she carried the flag for her native country at the opening ceremony of the 2000 Summer Olympics in Sydney, Australia.

She is currently a pastor at Monte de Dios, La Romana. She was inducted to the Dominican Republic Hall of Fame in 2016.

References

sports-reference

1979 births
Living people
Weightlifters at the 1999 Pan American Games
Weightlifters at the 2003 Pan American Games
Weightlifters at the 2000 Summer Olympics
Weightlifters at the 2004 Summer Olympics
Olympic weightlifters of the Dominican Republic
Dominican Republic female weightlifters
Pan American Games gold medalists for the Dominican Republic
Pan American Games medalists in weightlifting
Medalists at the 1999 Pan American Games
Medalists at the 2003 Pan American Games
20th-century Dominican Republic women